The Romanian men's national ice hockey team is the national men's ice hockey of Romania, and a member of the International Ice Hockey Federation. They are currently ranked 27th in the 2019 IIHF World Rankings and currently compete in Division IA. They have competed in four Olympic ice hockey competitions, the most recent being in 1980.

Olympic Games
Romania started Olympic hockey in 1964 in the B division. In the tournament, the team finished 12th out of 16 teams and managed 3 wins against Austria, Italy, and Hungary also with a tie against Yugoslavia. In 1968, Romania lost its qualification match against West Germany 7–0 and was forced to compete in the B division again. In the first two games, Romania beat Austria 3–2 and the Host, France 7–3. They lost their next three games and finished 12th out of 14 in the standings. After skipping the 1972 competition, Romania returned for the 1976 tournament. This time Romania played Poland in the Qualification round and lost 7–4, keeping them in the B division once again. However, Romania battled back and won 4 of 5 games with only one loss against Yugoslavia, still winning the division. The team finished 7th out of 12. In 1980, Romania was able to play with the top teams and was put into the Blue Division group, along with tough opponents such as Sweden, Czechoslovakia, and USA. In the first game Romania was down 4–2 to West Germany, but managed to score 4 goals to beat the former bronze medallists 6–4. In their next game Romania got shut out by Sweden 8–0. The Swedes scored 3 goals in the first period which left Romania out of it. After a lopsided loss to Czechoslovakia (7–2) the team then took on USA. The US jumped out to a 2–0 lead in the first period and added two more to it to lead 4–1 after two periods. Unlike other teams that the US had faced, the Romanians fought strong in the third period, despite being outshot 15–3, and scored a goal. The final score was 7–2. Romania played Norway for their final game, who had lost all four of their past games and had no chance to advance to the Medal Round. Romania fell behind less than a minute into the game, but stormed back to take the lead 3–1 in the third period. The Norwegian team battled back though, and scored once with a minute and a half left to play, and scored once more to tie it with only 29 seconds left. This tie still gave Romania one point but they had been hoping for a win. They finished the tournament with a 1–3–1 record, and were ranked 8th out of 12, just beating the Netherlands, West Germany, Norway, and Japan. This was the last time that the Romanians competed in the Olympic tournaments.

Tournament record

Olympic record

World Championship

 1931 – 10th place
 1933 – 9th place
 1934 – 10th place
 1935 – 11th place
 1937 – 10th place
 1938 – 13th place
 1947 – 7th place
 1959 – 13th place (1st in Pool B)
 1961 – 15th place (1st in Pool C)
 1963 – 11th place (3rd in Pool B)
 1966 – 10th place (2nd in Pool B)
 1967 – 10th place (2nd in Pool B)
 1969 – 12th place (6th in Pool B)
 1970 – 13th place (7th in Pool B)
 1971 – 15th place (1st in Pool C)
 1972 – 10th place (4th in Pool B)
 1973 – 10th place (4th in Pool B)
 1974 – 12th place (6th in Pool B)
 1975 – 11th place (5th in Pool B)
 1976 – 9th place (1st in Pool B)
 1977 – 8th place
 1978 – 12th place (4th in Pool B)
 1979 – 11th place (3rd in Pool B)
 1981 – 13th place (5th in Pool B)
 1982 – 13th place (5th in Pool B)
 1983 – 15th place (7th in Pool B)
 1985 – 20th place (4th in Pool C)
 1986 – 20th place (4th in Pool C)
 1987 – 19th place (3rd in Pool C)
 1989 – 26th place (2nd in Pool D)
 1990 – 20th place (4th in Pool C)
 1991 – 19th place (3rd in Pool C)

 1992 – 18th place (6th in Pool B)
 1993 – 18th place (6th in Pool B)
 1994 – 19th place (7th in Pool B)
 1995 – 20th place (8th in Pool B)
 1996 – 26th place (6th in Pool C)
 1997 – 25th place (5th in Pool C)
 1998 – 26th place (2nd in Pool C)
 1999 – 26th place (2nd in Pool C)
 2000 – 30th place (6th in Pool C)
 2001 – 29th place (1st in Division II, Group B)
 2002 – 25th place (5th in Division I, Group A)
 2003 – 26th place (5th in Division I, Group B)
 2004 – 25th place (5th in Division I, Group B)
 2005 – 27th place (6th in Division I, Group B)
 2006 – 29th place (1st in Division II, Group A)
 2007 – 27th place (6th in Division I, Group B)
 2008 – 29th place (1st in Division II, Group A)
 2009 – 28th place (6th in Division I, Group B)
 2010 – 31st place (2nd in Division II, Group B)
 2011 – 29th place (1st in Division II, Group B)
 2012 – 26th place (4th in Division I, Group B)
 2013 – 26th place (4th in Division I, Group B)
 2014 – 28th place (6th in Division I, Group B)
 2015 – 29th place (1st in Division II, Group A)
 2016 – 28th place (6th in Division I, Group B)
 2017 – 29th place (1st in Division II, Group A)
 2018 – 27th place (5th in Division I, Group B)
 2019 – 23rd place (1st in Division I, Group B)
 2020 – Cancelled due to the COVID-19 pandemic
 2021 – Cancelled due to the COVID-19 pandemic
 2022 – 21st place (5th in Division I, Group A)
 2023 – (Division I, Group A)

Winter Universiade
1966 – 2nd place (Silver medal)
1983 – 3rd place (Bronze medal)

References

External links

IIHF profile

 
National ice hockey teams in Europe